Marguerite Crissay (1874–1945) was a French artist known for her painting and sculpture.

Biography 
Crissay was born in 1874 in Mirecourt. She exhibited at the Société des Artistes Indépendants, the Salon des Tuileries, and the Salon d'Automne. She died in 1945 in Paris.

Gallery

References

External links

1874 births
1945 deaths
People from Mirecourt
19th-century French women artists
20th-century French women artists